The Cape Coast Castle Museum is an ethnography and archeological museum located in Cape Coast, Ghana. It was established in 1974.

References

See also 
 List of museums in Ghana

Cape Coast
Museums in Ghana
Museums established in 1974
1974 establishments in Ghana